Golem is a 1996 picture book written and illustrated by David Wisniewski.  With illustrations made of cut-paper collages, it is Wisniewski's retelling of the Jewish folktale of the Golem with a one-page background at the end.

Plot
The story is set in year 1580 in Prague, and the Jews are being persecuted. Judah Loew ben Bezalel, the town rabbi, can think of nothing more than creating a being out of mud and bringing it to life, using the holy name of God, to protect them. Once the Golem stops the persecution, Rabbi Loew erases the letters on the Golem's head, making the Golem "sleep the dreamless sleep of clay". The ending is ambiguous, ending with the words: "But many say he could awaken. Perhaps when the desperate need for justice is united with holy purpose, Golem will come to life once more."

Awards
The book won the Caldecott Medal in 1997.

References

External links 
"Golems Are Big in Children's Literature" in Tablet Magazine
Review by Kirkus
 

1996 children's books
Caldecott Medal–winning works
American picture books
Children's fiction books
Golem
Jewish folklore
Works set in Prague
Clarion Books books